Aghanus is a village in the Lachin District of Azerbaijan. According to Minister of Territorial Administration and Infrastructure of Nagorno Karabakh, Hayk Khanumyan, the village is located in the new corridor between Armenia and Nagorno-Karabakh, controlled by Russian peacekeepers, that replaced the Lachin corridor in August 2022.

History 
The village was located in the Armenian-occupied territories surrounding Nagorno-Karabakh, coming under the control of ethnic Armenian forces during the First Nagorno-Karabakh War in the early 1990s, subsequently becoming part of the breakaway Republic of Artsakh as part of its Kashatagh Province. The village was returned to Azerbaijan as part of the 2020 Nagorno-Karabakh ceasefire agreement.

References

External links 
 

Villages in Azerbaijan
Populated places in Lachin District
Former Armenian inhabited settlements